The Ornate Aphid, or Violet aphid, (Myzus ornatus), is an aphid in the superfamily Aphidoidea in the order Hemiptera. It is a true bug and sucks sap from plants. It is an invasive species.

Host plants
It is known to live on both wild Cherry and domesticated cherry varieties. Also Astrantia pontica.

References 

 http://aphid.aphidnet.org/Myzus_ornatus.php
 http://influentialpoints.com/Gallery/Myzus_ornatus_Ornate_aphid_Violet_aphid.htm
 https://www.itis.gov/servlet/SingleRpt/SingleRpt?search_topic=TSN&search_value=200634

Agricultural pest insects
Macrosiphini